Kossi Agassa (born 2 July 1978) is a French-Togolese former professional footballer who played as a goalkeeper. He spent most of his club career in France. Between 1999 and 2017, he made 74 FIFA-official appearances for the Togo national team.

Having played for the Étoile Filante de Lomé in Togo and Africa Sports in the Ivory Coast, he moved to French club FC Metz in 2002 where he stayed until 2006. Following a one-year stint at Spanish club Hércules CF, he joined Stade de Reims in 2008 where he amassed 167 league appearances during an eight-year stay interrupted by a loan to FC Istres in the 2009–10 season. He ended his career after one season at US Granville.

Club career
In July 2016, after eight years with Stade de Reims, Agassa became unwanted at the club and was left out of first-team training. On 11 August 2016, he agreed to the termination of his contract.

International career
With over 50 caps for Togo national team he is one of his country's most experienced players, and was called up to the 2006 World Cup as the first-choice goalkeeper. He is known as "Magic Hands".

In 2013 he played in all matches at 2013 Africa Cup of Nations when his team reached the quarter-finals.

References

External links
 
 
 

1978 births
Living people
Association football goalkeepers
Togolese footballers
Togo international footballers
2000 African Cup of Nations players
2002 African Cup of Nations players
2006 Africa Cup of Nations players
2006 FIFA World Cup players
2010 Africa Cup of Nations players
2013 Africa Cup of Nations players
2017 Africa Cup of Nations players
Ligue 2 players
Étoile Filante du Togo players
Africa Sports d'Abidjan players
FC Metz players
Stade de Reims players
Hércules CF players
FC Istres players
US Granville players
Togolese expatriate footballers
Togolese expatriate sportspeople in Ivory Coast
Expatriate footballers in Ivory Coast
Togolese expatriate sportspeople in France
Expatriate footballers in France
Togolese expatriate sportspeople in Spain
Expatriate footballers in Spain
21st-century Togolese people